Frank B. Warner (November 5, 1863 – February 15, 1944) was an American politician who served in the Missouri Senate and the Missouri House of Representatives.  He was educated in the St. Louis area public schools. Warner did not make a floor speech in the legislature until he had surpassed 22 years of service, and then spoke for only a minute. He introduced only one bill, due to his belief that law books were already overburdened with laws.

Warner died in his home in St. Louis at the age of 79.

References

Republican Party members of the Missouri House of Representatives
Republican Party Missouri state senators
1863 births
1944 deaths